Massive is an adjective related to mass.

Massive may refer to:

Arts, entertainment, and media
 Massive (band), an Australian Hard Rock band
 Massive, an album by The Supervillains released in 2008
 Massive Attack, a British musical group, who were temporarily known as Massive in 1991
 "Massive" (song), a song by Drake from the 2022 album Honestly, Nevermind
 Massive (TV series), a situation comedy first aired on BBC3 in September 2008
 Massive! (TV programme), a short-lived Saturday morning British television programme (1995–1996)
 MMO Games Magazine, formerly MASSIVE Magazine, a short-lived computer magazine
 Massive: Gay Erotic Manga and the Men Who Make It, a 2014 manga anthology 
 The Massive (comics), an ongoing comic series
 The Massive, a starship in the U.S. animated television series Invader Zim
 Massive, the villain in Loonatics Unleashed, a U.S. animated television series
 Massive Theatre Company, professional theatre company in Auckland, New Zealand

Businesses
 Massive Development, a German computer game developer, acquired by JoWooD Productions in December 2000
 Massive Entertainment, a Swedish computer game developer
 Massive Goods, an American gay manga publisher
 Massive Incorporated, a subsidiary of Microsoft that implements dynamic advertising in video games

Computing and technology
 MASSIVE (software), a software package for generating crowd-related visual effects for film and television
 NI Massive, a software synthesizer VST plugin from Native Instruments

Mountains
 Mount Massive, Colorado, United States
 Massive Range, a part of the Canadian Rockies in Alberta, Canada 
 Massive Mountain

See also

 
 
 Mass (disambiguation)
 Massif (disambiguation)